Wolcott is a neighborhood of Kansas City, Kansas, in the United States.

Wolcott was originally called Connor, and under the latter name was platted as a village in 1868. When the railroad was extended to that point in 1902, it was renamed in honor of Herbert Wolcott, a railroad official.

References

Neighborhoods in Kansas City, Kansas